"Not with a Bang" is a science fiction short story by American writer  Damon Knight. It first appeared in the winter 1949 issue of The Magazine of Fantasy and Science Fiction and has been reprinted a number of times, including in Far Out (1961), The Best of Damon Knight (1976), 50 Short Science Fiction Tales, and The Eureka Years (1982).

Synopsis 
The story is an ironic, Adam-and-Eve tale.  Humanity has been wiped out by a nuclear war, except for one man and woman, who meet in a restaurant in Salt Lake City. The man suffers from a disease that causes recurrent episodes of total paralysis. While in the bathroom, he has an attack, and dies with the realization that the woman is too prudish to enter and save him.

Background
Knight has written that this was the first of his stories that he considered to be of professional quality. He said that the idea for the story
came to me during the time it took for a men's-room door to close behind me in a Swedish restaurant in New York.  I didn't have the characters or the setting, but I had the whole structure; all I needed was to find parts that fit.

References

External links

1949 short stories
Science fiction short stories
Works originally published in The Magazine of Fantasy & Science Fiction
Short stories by Damon Knight